Ramzi Ben Sliman (born 1982) is a French film director and screenwriter.

Filmography
 2007: Mon homme (short)
 2010: En France (short)
 2016: My Revolution
 2019: Grand hôtel Barbès (short)
 2022: Neneh Superstar
 2023: Le Jeune Imam (only screenwriter)

Awards and nominations

References

External links
 
 Ramzi Ben Sliman on UniFrance
 Ramzi Ben Sliman on AlloCiné
 Ramzi Ben Sliman on Cineuropa

1982 births
Living people
People from Paris
French film directors
French screenwriters
French-language film directors
École Normale Supérieure alumni